The Marlow-Hunter 42SS is an American sailboat that was designed by the Hunter Design Team as a cruiser and first built in 2016.

The "SS" designation is intended to refer to automobiles of the past, like the Chevrolet Camaro SS, "as it connotes the era of American Muscle Cars denoting “Super Sport” when lumbering and obese chariots had held sway previously."

The 42SS may be confused with the unrelated 1989 42-foot sailboat design, the Hunter Passage 42.

Production
The design was built by Hunter Marine in the United States, starting in 2016 and remained in production through 2019.

Design
The Marlow-Hunter 42SS is a recreational keelboat, built predominantly of fiberglass with Kevlar reinforcing in the forward hull and polypropylene honeycomb Nida-cores. It has a fractional sloop B&R rig, a stainless steel arch that mounts the mainsheet traveler, a nearly plumb stem, a reverse transom with a fold-down swimming platform and folding ladder, an internally mounted spade-type rudder controlled by a laterally tilting, folding wheel and a fixed deep fin keel or shoal draft keel. The deep draft fin keel version displaces  and carries  of ballast, while the shoal draft keel version displaces  and carries  of ballast.

The steering wheel can be set in port, center or starboard positions by use of a foot locking lever, as desired by the helmsman. This provides the advantages of a dual-wheel configuration, but occupies less cockpit space. The wheel also folds when not in use.

The holding tank holds .

Factory options included roller furling jib and mast-furling mainsail.

Operational history
In a short review upon the introduction of the design in 2016, Cruising World, reported that "Cat’s-eye-style ports run the length of the low-profile cabin top, and the house extends well aft to provide lots of living space below."

See also
List of sailing boat types

Similar sailboats
C&C 42 Custom
C&C 131
Hunter Passage 42

References

External links

Keelboats
2010s sailboat type designs
Sailing yachts
Sailboat type designs by Hunter Design Team
Sailboat types built by Hunter Marine